Live at the Camden Underworld is a live DVD showcasing the full-length gig from January 2004 featuring Captain Everything!, Divit and Belvedere.  It was filmed at the Camden Underworld in London, England.

Track listing
Captain Everything!
Chuck Me In
Problem With Numbers
The One Minute Love Song
There's No 'I' in Scene
Hey Lags! Nice Slacks!!
While You Are Asleep...
Kalimbah!
The Cheesiest Line
The Party's Next Door
Rocket Science?
My Girlfriend's Dad Runs a Sweatshop
Petrol Fumes
Picture of You
I'd Rather Have a Full Bottle In Front of Me Than a Full Frontal Lobotomy
Divit
Before They Do
Driver
Misunderstanding Maybe
Sewn Together
Catch Me If You Can
No Regrets
In Slow Forward Motion
Sky
Wish I Could Be
Belvedere
Subhuman Nature
Not My Problem
Repetition Rejection
A Juxtaposition Of Action and Reason
Brandy Wine
Slaves to the Pavement
The Only Problem With Wishful Thinking
Quicksand
Cellophane Coffin
She Sells and Sand Sandwiches

External links
DVD page on Punkervision.net

2004 video albums
Live video albums
Collaborative albums
2004 live albums
Captain Everything! albums